Sitnije, Cile, sitnije is a maxi single by Yugoslav pop-folk singer Lepa Brena. It was released on 16 March 1983 through the record label PGP-RTB.

This was her third of twelve albums with the band Slatki Greh.

Background 
Composer of both compositions is Kornelije Kovač and a songwriter Marina Tucaković.

With the title song "Sitnije, Cile, sitnije", Lepa Brena participated in Jugovizija, the Yugoslav selection for the Eurovision Song Contest 1983, held on 16 March 1983 in the studio RTV Novi Sad in Novi Sad. Given the type of music they performed, their participation in this type of competition caused many surprises, but also disappointment with their fans, because Lepa Brena and Slatki Greh finished only seventh on Jugovizija. The winner was Danijel Popović with the song "Džuli", taking the fourth place at Eurovision, this repeating until then the greatest success of Yugoslav representatives in this type of competition. The song became a big hit, and the singer and the whole group achieved even greater popularity.

Immediately after Jugovizija, the album "Sitnije, Cile, sitnije", published by the production company PGP RTB, was launched and quickly achieved a tremendous success with 800,000 copies sold. After that, their first major tour of Yugoslavia followed, concerts with a record number of visitors, thanks to which, according to Lepa Brena herself, she deserves to be attributed the status of an "undisputed star".

The same year, music group Griva made a heavy metal parody on Brena's Eurovision debacle. The composition was titled "Sitnije, sestro, sitnije" and it was printed in 120,000 copies, published by Jugoton. With good marketing support, Griva was then placed at the very top of the Yugoslav rock scene.

Track listing

Personnel

Crew
Ivan Ćulum – design
Dragoljub Milovanović – photography

Release history

References

1983 albums
Lepa Brena albums
PGP-RTB albums
Serbo-Croatian language albums